The III Bomber Command is a disbanded United States Air Force headquarters. It was established in September 1941, shortly before the attack on Pearl Harbor to command bomber units assigned to 3rd Air Force.  Following the entry of the United States into World War II, it flew patrols off the south Atlantic and Gulf coasts.  However, its main efforts soon began organizing and training medium bomber units and aircrews.   Its last assignment was with Third Air Force at MacDill Field, Florida.   It was inactivated on 8 April 1946 and disbanded in October 1948.

History

Background
GHQ Air Force (GHQ AF) had been established with two major combat functions, to maintain a striking force against long range targets, and the air defense of the United States.  In the spring of 1941, GHQ AF reorganized its Southeast Air District as 3rd Air Force.  To carry out its mission of training and maintaining a strike force, 3rd Air Force organized 3rd Bomber Command at Drew Field, Florida in September 1941, shortly before the attack on Pearl Harbor.  The command soon moved to MacDill Field, Florida, where it was located when the attack on Pearl Harbor occurred.  Shortly afterwards, it moved to Army Air Base, Savannah, Georgia, but returned to MacDill, where it spent the remainder of the war.

Training
It patrolled in search of enemy submarines.

The command trained medium bomber units and crews for Third Air Force, and training for this type of unit was virtually a monopoly for the command.  Until August 1943, it also conducted training for dive and light bomber units and crews.  However their training was transferred to III Air Support Command in August 1942.

In late 1943, some heavy bomber training was moved from Second Air Force, which had been the primary command for that training, to the command in order to enable combined training between fighters and bombers.  In conjunction with this transfer, the command adopted the three phase training system for its training units: Phase I (individual training); Phase II (crew training) and Phase III (unit training).

Lineage
 Constituted as the 3rd Bomber Command on 4 September 1941 
 Activated on 5 September 1941
 Redesignated  III Bomber Command on 18 September 1942
 Inactivated on 8 April 1946
 Disbanded on 8 October 1948

Assignments
 Third Air Force, 5 September 1941
 Probably Tactical Air Command, 21 March 1946 – 8 April 1946

Components
Wings
 89th Combat Crew Training Wing, from 19 June 1944
 323d Combat Crew Training Wing, 22 February 1945 – 8 April 1946
Groups

 3rd Bombardment Group, 8 December 1941 - 2 January 1942
 12th Bombardment Group, 18 April – 16 August 1942
 21st Bombardment Group, 11 March – 2 May 1942; 8 May 1942 – 10 October 1943
 30th Bombardment Group: 15 January – 24 May 1941
 46th Bombardment Group, 8 May – c. 8 July 1942; 6 August 1943 – 1 May 1944
 47th Bombardment Group, 1 May – 10 August 1942 (attached to 3d Ground Air Support Command after 29 June 1942)
 48th Bombardment Group, 8 May – 10 August 1942 
 85th Bombardment Group, 16 March - 2 May 1942; 8 May – 10 August 1942
 86th Bombardment Group: 10 August 1942 – c. 11 May 1943 (attached to 23d Provisional Training Wing, c. September 1942 – c. March 1943)
 90th Bombardment Group: 15 April – 12 September 1942
 91st Bombardment Group: 15 April – c. 28 June 1942
 92d Bombardment Group: 1 March – August 1942
 94th Bombardment Group: 15–29 June 1942
 95th Bombardment Group: 15–26 June 1942
 100th Bombardment Group: 1–18 June 1942
 310th Bombardment Group: 15 March – 2 May 1942
 312th Bombardment Group, 16 March – 2 May 1942
 319th Bombardment Group: 26 June – c. 12 September 1942
 322d Bombardment Group: 17 July – c. 15 November 1942
 335th Bombardment Group, 31 July 1942 – 1 May 1944?
 336th Bombardment Group, c. 15 July 1942 – 1 May 1944
 386th Bombardment Group, 1 December 1942 – c. 2 June 1943
 409th Bombardment Group, 6 August 1943 – 7 March 1944
 410th Bombardment Group, 6 August 1943 – 4 April 1944
 416th Bombardment Group, 6 August 1943 – January 1944 (attached to II Tactical Air Division 1−22 November 1943)

Squadrons
 1st Composite Squadron: 19 November 1944 – 2 January 1945
 3d Reconnaissance Squadron; 5 June 1941 – 25 February 1942 (attached to 13th Bombardment Group)
 35th Reconnaissance Squadron (Fighter); 15 August – 1 September 1943
 38th Reconnaissance Squadron (Bombardment; 15 August – 1 September 1943

Stations 
 Drew Field, Florida, 5 September 1941
 MacDill Field, Florida, c. September 1941
 Army Air Base, Savannah, Georgia, c. 10 December 1941
 MacDill Field, Florida, c. 15 December 1941 – 8 April 1946

References

Notes
 Explanatory notes

 Citations

Bibliography

 
 
 
 

03
03
Military units and formations disestablished in 1946